Jo Porter is an Australian TV producer and executive. She is best known for her association with the Seven Network drama department for whom she produced All Saints, Always Greener, Headland and Packed to the Rafters. In 2011, she became Director of Drama for Fremantle Media Australia.

She is the co-creator of the TV series Wonderland.

References

External links

Australian television producers
Australian women television producers
Year of birth missing (living people)
Living people